José Jesuíta Barbosa Neto (born 26 June 1991) is a Brazilian actor. He is considered an important talent of recent Brazilian cinema and has performed in critically acclaimed feature films.

Biography

Jesuíta was born in Salgueiro and spent his childhood in Parnamirim, both cities of the hinterlands of Pernambuco. At the age of ten he moved to Fortaleza, Ceará, where he began acting in theater groups at the school. Although his father, a Civil Police delegate, wanted him to enter Law or Medicine, he enrolled in the Basic Principles course of the José de Alencar Theater, and later in the Degree course in Theater of the Federal Institute of Ceará.

Career 
Barbosa began his career in the theater, participating in pieces with Center of Experiments in Movements. He made his film debut in the short film O Melhor Amigo.

He has been successful in the respected Cinema of Pernambuco, acting in movies of filmmakers such as Serra Pelada by Heitor Dhalia. His first prize was the Redentor Trophy for Best Actor at the 2013 Rio Film Festival for the movie Tatuagem by Hilton Lacerda.

In television he gained prominence in the telenovela O Rebu and in the series Ligações Perigosas and Justiça.

Personal life
In 2017, Barbosa revealed to be bisexual, having relationships with men and women. In an interview with Veja magazine, also in 2017, Jesuíta declared: "We can talk about sexuality, but not about relationships. The intimacy of each one does not need to be exposed. That's very beautiful, but talking about my family or who I'm with, no. I'm free and I stay with whoever I want, whether men or women. I prefer not to block myself." The actor dated fellow actor and photographer Fábio Audi from 2014 to 2021.

Filmography

Television

Film

Theater

Awards and Directions

References

External links 
 

1991 births
Living people
People from Pernambuco
Brazilian male television actors
Brazilian male film actors
Brazilian male stage actors
Brazilian LGBT actors
Bisexual male actors
People from Fortaleza
21st-century Brazilian male actors
Brazilian bisexual people